The Evil Forest is a 1951 Spanish drama film directed by Daniel Mangrané. It was entered into the 1952 Cannes Film Festival.

Plot

During World War III, two soldiers enter a ruined building.
They find an old book containing the story of Parsifal.

The story is located in Spain during the barbarian invasions.
The warrior Roderico, tired of fighting, stops Klingsor from abusing a captive woman. 
Klingsor challenges him as a coward before the barbarian king who holds the holy lance.
In the fight, Roderico wins but refuses to kill Klingsor, who treacherously wounds him.
Roderico leaves with the captive.
The king disapproves of treachery.
Klingsor challenges him and becomes the king of the barbarians.
He devotes himself to magic.

After Roderico's death, the captive bears a boy, Parsifal.
She tries to find the grail but cannot.
They refuge in Montserrat. 
A troop of grail knights passes and encourages the young child.
When looking for Parsifal, his mother falls to her death.
Parsifal is bred by wolves in the mountain.

As a young man armed with his father's bow, Parsifal meets the knights again.
He also meets Kundria, Klingsor's daughter, the first woman he meets after his mother.
He watches Kundria seduce Amfortas, who is wounded by Klingsor.
Klingsor sends his virgin daughter to seduce Parsifal, but he refuses.
She repents and leaves.

Parsifal clashes with Klingsor's tribe. 
A barbarian dwarf changes sides and brings the knights.
Parsifal and Klingsor fight a single combat.
Like his father, Parsifal wins and Klingsor tries to kill treacherously.
The dwarf kills him with Roderico's bow.

Parsifal quests helping the weak against the oppressors.
He confronts the seven capital sins in the guise of young women.
He resists temptation and proceeds in his quest.
Having smelled the flower of pride, his good deeds are however tainted.

Years pass.
Parsifal's feats are no longer out of pride.
Amfortas suffers of his wound and the grail is kept in a case.
On Good Friday, Gurnemancio meets an armed knight.
He reproaches him, and the knight disarms, revealing Parsifal with Christ-like beard and mane.
Parsifal kneels before the lance and his sword, that are laid in a cross shape. 
Kundria has led a life of repentance and washes Parsifal's feet with her hair, like Mary of Bethany did to Jesus.
He baptises her.
Entering the grail cave, he touches Amfortas with the lance.
A dove returns to fly over the grail.

In the frame story, the soldiers close the book and watch an old priest leaving a chalice on the altar of a ruined church while supernatural light shines on it.

Cast
 Gustavo Rojo - Parsifal
 Ludmilla Tchérina - The Woman (Kundria / Parsifal's mother)
 Félix de Pomés - Klingsor
 Jesús Varela - The Dwarf
 Ángel Jordán - Roderico
 José Luis Hernández - Parsifal - as a young boy
 Teresa Planell - The Old Woman
 Alfonso Estela - Anfortas
 Carlo Tamberlani - Gurnemancio
 José Bruguera - Titurel
 Ricardo Fusté - Alisan
 Nuria Alfonso - Rage
 Tony Domenech - Gluttony
 Rosa Monero - Sloth
 Elena Montevar - Envy
 Carmen Zaro - Greed
 Carmen de Lirio - Pride
 Josefina Ramos - Lust

References

External links

1951 films
1951 drama films
1950s musical drama films
Spanish musical drama films
1950s Spanish-language films
Films directed by Daniel Mangrané
Spanish black-and-white films
Films based on works by Richard Wagner
Arthurian films
Parsifal
Films based on works by Chrétien de Troyes
Works based on Perceval, the Story of the Grail
Films about World War III
Fictional feral children
Barbarians
Films set in Catalonia
Films set in the 5th century